The Kalinga Prize for the Popularization of Science is an award given by UNESCO for exceptional skill in presenting scientific ideas to lay people. It was created in 1952, following a donation from Biju Patnaik, Founder President of the Kalinga Foundation Trust in India.

Background
The recipient of this annual award must have demonstrated – during a brilliant career as writer, editor, lecturer, film producer, radio/television programme director or presenter  – talent in interpreting science and technology for the public. The recipient should have striven to emphasize the international importance of science and technology and the contribution they make to improving public welfare, enriching the cultural heritage of nations, and solving problems facing humanity. Many past prize winners have been scientists, while others have been trained in journalism or have been educators or writers.

Each member state is entitled to nominate a single candidate, through its National Commission for UNESCO, on the recommendation of the national associations for the advancement of science or other science associations, or national associations of science writers or science journalists. Applications from individuals are not accepted.

The laureate is selected by the Director-General of UNESCO upon the recommendation of a four-member jury designated by him. Three members of the jury from different countries of the world are designated on the basis of equitable geographical distribution and the fourth on the recommendation of the Kalinga Foundation Trust.

The Kalinga Prize is awarded during the Celebration of the World Science Day in odd years (2003, 2005, etc.) and in New Delhi, India, in even years. Under the terms of the Prize, the recipient receives twenty thousand dollars (US$20,000) and a UNESCO Albert Einstein Silver Medal. The recipient is also awarded the Ruchi Ram Sahni Chair, introduced by the Government of India in 2001 to mark the 50th anniversary of the Kalinga Prize. As holder of the Ruchi Ram Sahni Chair, the winner travels to India for a period of two to four weeks as the guest of the Government of India. The Chair also comprises a token honorarium of US$5,000. In the years when the award ceremony take place during the celebration of the World Science Day, the recipient travels to the city where the science day is being celebrated (2003 in Budapest) as the guest of UNESCO. In the years when it is awarded in New Delhi, the recipient is invited, as the guest of the Kalinga Foundation Trust, to undertake a brief lecture tour in India. For this reason, it is preferable that the recipient be proficient in English.

Each National Commission for UNESCO proposes a candidate only on the recommendation of the national associations for the advancement of science or other science associations, or national associations of science writers or scientific journalists.

The Kalinga Prize for the Popularization of Science is administered by the Science Analysis and Policies Division of UNESCO.

Kalinga Prize laureates
Source: UNESCO

Statistics
By 2021 the prize had been awarded to 71 people from 26 countries:

Kalinga Samman
From 2010, the Kalinga Foundation Trust instituted a state level prize under the name Kalinga Samman for Popularization of Science. The award will be presented annually to an eminent scientist and science litterateur from the state of Odisha for outstanding contribution for popularization of science among the public.

Kalinga Samman laureates
Source: Kalinga Samman

See also
 Public awareness of science
 Popularization of science
 Science journalism
 Physics Outreach
 List of general science and technology awards 
 List of science communication awards

References

External links

UNESCO awards
Science communication awards

Memorials to Biju Patnaik